Edward Alvin White (born April 4, 1947) is an American former professional football player who played as a guard in the National Football League (NFL). After retiring from football, White has worked as a coach and artist.

Biography
White grew up in Lemon Grove, California, and attended Helix High School in La Mesa as a freshman before moving to Coachella Valley. He graduated from Indio High School in Indio, California.  White attended the University of California, Berkeley, playing for the California Golden Bears (1966–1968) as a lineman. He was named a consensus All-American player in 1968.

White began his professional football career with the Minnesota Vikings after being drafted in the second round of the 1969 AFL/NFL draft.  He is one of 11 players to have played in all four Vikings Super Bowl appearances between 1969 and 1976.  Before the 1978 season, he was traded to the San Diego Chargers, with whom he played until 1985 when he retired after 17 years and 241 games.  Mainly used at offensive guard, he was selected to the Pro Bowl four times. He played as an offensive lineman for the Chargers 1978-85.

After retiring from the NFL, White worked as a football coach.

Awards and honors

Following his retirement, he was inducted into College Football Hall of Fame, University of California Hall of Fame, Breitbard Hall of Fame,  East-West Shrine Game Hall of Fame, and the Chargers Hall of Fame. Indio High School named their football field Ed White Stadium in his honor. As a testament to his impact on every team he played on, in 2015 Ed White was selected to the Pac-12 All Century Football team, playing defensive tackle at Cal.

Charger quarterback Dan Fouts has been vocal about endorsing White for the Pro Football Hall of Fame: “When he retired, nobody had played in more games (241) as an offensive lineman than Ed White. They don’t have many statistics for offensive linemen other than Pro Bowls and Super Bowls, but Ed would be a leader. He was one of the most feared offensive linemen in the game. You talk to guys like Howie Long and Matt Millen who had to go against Big Ed. They hated it.” Chargers center/guard Dennis McKnight has called White “probably the best all-around offensive lineman in the league in terms of run blocking and pass blocking.” Kansas City Chiefs offensive tackle Kyle Turley has called White the best coach he'd ever had.

In 2019, the Professional Football Researchers Association named White to the PFRA Hall of Very Good Class of 2019

References

External links
Ed White Studio
"Being Big Ed: A Portrait of the Artist as an Aging NFL Lineman" by Pat Joseph, California magazine, Spring 2011.

1947 births
Living people
Players of American football from San Diego
All-American college football players
American Conference Pro Bowl players
American football offensive linemen
California Golden Bears football players
College Football Hall of Fame inductees
Minnesota Vikings players
National Conference Pro Bowl players
San Diego Chargers players
People from Indio, California